Vartiania muscula is a moth in the family Cossidae. It is found in Kazakhstan.

References

Natural History Museum Lepidoptera generic names catalog

Moths described in 1912
Cossinae